Katherine "Kathy" Anne Yelick, an American computer scientist, is the Vice Chancellor for Research and the Robert S. Pepper Professor of Electrical Engineering and Computer Sciences at the University of California, Berkeley. She is also a faculty scientist at Lawrence Berkeley National Laboratory, where she was Associate Laboratory Director for Computing Sciences from 2010-2019.

Education and scientific career
Katherine Yelick received her SB, SM, and PhD in computer science from the Massachusetts Institute of Technology, completing her thesis in 1990. She joined the faculty at the University of California, Berkeley in 1991, and was appointed a joint-appointment faculty research scientist at Lawrence Berkeley National Laboratory in 1996. She has done research across a broad range of computing sciences: high performance computing, systems programming, parallel algorithms, and computational genomics. 

Yelick is known for her work in partitioned global address space programming languages, including co-inventing the Unified Parallel C (UPC) and Titanium languages. She was a co-author of the first book to explain the language Unified Parallel C and its use. She also led the Sparsity project, the first automatically tuned library for sparse matrix kernels, and she co-led the development of the Optimized Sparse Kernel Interface (OSKI).

Academic and Research Leadership 
Yelick served from 2008 to 2012 as the Director of the National Energy Research Scientific Computing Center (NERSC), the scientific computing center that provides high-performance computing facilities and associated expertise to over 9,000 scientists supported by the U.S. Department of Energy Office of Science. In 2010, she was appointed the Associate Laboratory Director for Computing Sciences at Berkeley Lab, overseeing NERSC, the high-speed research network Energy Sciences Network (ESnet), and the Computing Research Division.  In this role she managed an organization with a research budget of about $150 million. 

In her role as Associate Laboratory Director, Yelick led the development of the 2019 Computing Sciences Strategic Plan for Berkeley Lab. In the introduction to that plan, she said:  
She also led a major initiative, Machine Learning (ML) for Science, in which researchers developed advanced machine learning tools to accelerate discovery in a wide range of scientific disciplines. In 2021, Yelick delivered the inaugural lecture in the distinguished lecture series at the Harvard Institute for Applied Computational Science, with the title "Machine Learning in Science: Applications, Algorithms, and Architectures."

Since 2021, Yelick has served as the Vice Chancellor for Research (VCR) at the University of California, Berkeley.  In this role, she provides the primary leadership in research policy, planning, and administration, and also leads university-industry relations, research compliance, research communications, and federal research development. The VCR supervises over fifty campus research units, twelve research museums and remote field stations, and the research administration offices. The research enterprise at UC Berkeley attracted $871 million in extramural support in the fiscal year ending June 30, 2022.

Awards and honors
From 2012 to 2015, Yelick received three awards from the Association for Computing Machinery (ACM). 
2012: She was named as an ACM Fellow "for [her] contributions to parallel computing languages that  have been used in both the research community and in production environments." 
2013: She received the ACM-W Athena Lecturer award at SC13 "for her contributions to parallel programming languages that improve programmer productivity." 
2015 She received the ACM Ken Kennedy Award "for advancing the programmability of HPC systems, strategic national leadership, and mentorship in academia and government labs."

In 2017 Yelick was elected to both the National Academy of Engineering and to the American Academy of Arts and Sciences. The NAE award was "for software innovation and leadership in high-performance computing." The American Academy citation said that "her research enables use of new high-performance architectures and eases programming of applications with irregular communication patterns." The following year she was elected as a fellow of the American Association for the Advancement of Science. 

At the 2019 ACM/IEEE Supercomputing Conference SC19 Yelick was honored by HPCwire as their Editor’s Choice for Outstanding Leadership in HPC.

Personal life
Yelick is married to University of California, Berkeley professor James Demmel, who is also an ACM Fellow and works in computer science and numerical linear algebra.

References

Living people
American computer scientists
American women computer scientists
Women academic administrators
UC Berkeley College of Engineering faculty
MIT School of Engineering alumni
Fellows of the Association for Computing Machinery
Members of the United States National Academy of Engineering
Lawrence Berkeley National Laboratory people
Fellows of the American Association for the Advancement of Science
21st-century American women